Odostomia kromi is a species of sea snail, a marine gastropod mollusc in the family Pyramidellidae, the pyrams and their allies.

Description
The shell grows to a length of 1.7 mm. It's distribution is largely throughout the Mediterranean Sea

Distribution
This species occurs in the following locations:
 European waters (ERMS scope)
 Portuguese Exclusive Economic Zone
 Spanish Exclusive Economic Zone : Alboran Sea

References

External links
 
 To CLEMAM
 To Encyclopedia of Life
 To GenBank
 To USNM Invertebrate Zoology Mollusca Collection
 To World Register of Marine Species

kromi
Gastropods described in 1984